William Allaire Shortt (August 15, 1859 – March 9, 1915), was a Democrat, who represented Richmond County, New York in the New York State Assembly.

Biography
He was born in Florence, Massachusetts, on August 15, 1859. He graduated from the University of Toronto in 1880. He then attended New York University Law School and was admitted to the bar in 1882.

He was a member of the New York State Assembly representing Richmond County, New York in 1908, 1910 and 1911.

He died at his home at 218 St. Paul's Avenue in Tompkinsville, Staten Island on March 9, 1915.

References

1859 births
1915 deaths
Politicians from Northampton, Massachusetts
Democratic Party members of the New York State Assembly
People from Tompkinsville, Staten Island
University of Toronto alumni
19th-century American politicians